Again, for the First Time is the fourth full-length album by the Christian rock band Bleach.  It was released in 2002 on Tooth & Nail Records.

Track listing
"Intro" – 0:17
"Baseline" – 2:25
"Celebrate" – 2:40
"Broke in the Head" – 3:07
"We Are Tomorrow" – 2:53
"Fell Out" – 2:38
"Weak at the Knees" – 2:48
"Found You Out" – 3:05
"Said a Lot" – 3:17
"Almost Too Late" – 2:08
"Andy's Doin' Time" – 3:39
"Knocked Out" – 3:40
"Jenn's Song" – 1:47

References

Bleach (American band) albums
2002 albums
Tooth & Nail Records albums